Pinkovce is a small village and municipality in the Sobrance District in the Košice Region of east Slovakia.

History
In historical records the village was first mentioned in 1343.

Geography
The village lies at an altitude of 109 metres and covers an area of 3.135 km2. It has a population of about 190 people. Pinkovce sits on the west bank of the Uzh River at the point where the river forms the international boundary between Slovakia and Ukraine.

Culture
The village has a public library.

External links
 
https://web.archive.org/web/20080111223415/http://www.statistics.sk/mosmis/eng/run.html 
http://en.e-obce.sk/obec/pinkovce/pinkovce.html

Villages and municipalities in Sobrance District
Slovakia–Ukraine border crossings